The Story of Light Entertainment is a British documentary series shown on the BBC in 2006. The series comprises eight episodes and is narrated by Stephen Fry.

Episode 1: Double Acts 
The 1st part is dedicated to the double acts: Covering Abbott and Costello, Newman and Baddiel, The Two Ronnies, Morecambe and Wise, Hale and Pace, Little and Large, Mike and Bernie Winters, Peter Cook and Dudley Moore, French and Saunders, Adrian Edmondson and Rik Mayall, Fry and Laurie, Reeves and Mortimer, Smith and Jones, Little Britain, Ant and Dec.  Air date – 22 July

Episode 2: All-Round Entertainers 
Air date – 29 July

Episode 3: Radio Stars 
Air date – 5 August

Episode 4: The Comics 
Air date – 12 August

Episode 5: Pop and Easy Listening 
Air date – 19 August

Episode 6: Impressionists 
Air date – 26 August

Episode 7: Chat Shows 
Air date – 2 September

Episode 8: Variety 
Air date – 9 September

External links 
 
 http://www.comedy.co.uk/guide/tv/story_of_light_ent/
BBC

2006 British television series debuts
2006 British television series endings
2000s British documentary television series
BBC television documentaries